Chaudhry Muhammad Ashraf Warraich is a Pakistani politician who was a Member of the Provincial Assembly of the Punjab, from May 2013 to May 2018.

Early life and education
He was born on 20 September 1952 in Gujranwala.

He has a degree of Bachelor of Arts and a degree of Bachelor of Law.

Political career
He was elected to the Provincial Assembly of the Punjab as a candidate of Pakistan Muslim League (Nawaz) from Constituency PP-97 (Gujranwala-VII) in 2013 Pakistani general election.

References

Living people
Punjab MPAs 2013–2018
1952 births
Pakistan Muslim League (N) politicians